The Eternal Dream is a 1934 German historical film directed by Arnold Fanck and starring Sepp Rist and Brigitte Horney. The film's sets were designed by the art directors Robert Herlth and Werner Schlichting.

Cast
 Sepp Rist as Jacques Balmat
 Brigitte Horney as Maria
 Ernst Nansen as Paccard
 Eduard von Winterstein as Marias Vater
 Helene Fehdmer as Marias Mutter
 Friedrich Kayßler as Pfarrer
 Klaus Pohl as Balmats Vater
 Willy Kaiser-Heyl as Saussure
 Hans Hermann Schaufuß as Ein Bauer
 Walter Riml as Der Maler
 Ernst Dumcke as Der Dichter
 Pierre Provins as Der Heerführer

References

Bibliography

External links
 

1934 films
1930s historical adventure films
German historical adventure films
Films of Nazi Germany
1930s German-language films
Films directed by Arnold Fanck
Mountaineering films
UFA GmbH films
German multilingual films
Films set in France
Films set in the Alps
Films set in the 1780s
German black-and-white films
Cine-Allianz films
1934 multilingual films
1930s German films